The 2005–06 Stanford Cardinal men's basketball team represented Stanford University in the 2005–06 NCAA Division I men's basketball season. It was Trent Johnson's second season with the Cardinal. They were a member of the Pacific-10 Conference.

Previous season
The Cardinal finished Trent Johnson's first year achieving an overall record of 18-13 and an 11-7 record in conference play. Finishing a tie for third in the Pac-10 conference, the Cardinal defeated Washington State in the quarterfinals, only to lose in the semifinals to Washington.

The Cardinal earned a bid to the NCAA tournament as an 8 seed in the Austin Region. In their first, and only, game they faced against the #9 seed Mississippi State only to lose 93-70.

Schedule and results

|-
!colspan=12 style="background:#8C1515; color:white;"| Exhibition

|-
!colspan=12 style=| Non-conference regular season

|-
!colspan=12 style=| Pac-10 tournament

|-
!colspan=12 style="background:#8C1515;"| NIT

References

Stanford Cardinal men's basketball seasons
Stanford Cardinal
Stanford
Stanford Cardinal men's basketball team
Stanford Cardinal men's basketball team